The International Finance Investment and Commerce Bank Limited is a first generation Bangladeshi private commercial bank. The bank is ensuring cutting edge service with skilled workforce and revolutionary fintech support through more than 1240 modern business centers (Branches and Sub-Branches). It has extended its global corporate footprint in the form of Joint ventures and subsidiaries in Nepal, Oman and the UK

History
International Finance Investment and Commerce Bank Limited was established in 1976 as a joint venture between the Government of Bangladesh and private investors.

IFIC Bank established a joint venture bank in Nepal, called the Nepal Bangladesh Bank, with 50 per cent ownership in 1994.

Bangladesh Bank found evidence of fraud at IFIC Bank in January 1998 through fraudulent inland bills designed to siphon 1.55 billion BDT to companies, including BEXIMCO, linked to Salman F Rahman and Sohel F Rahman, directors of the bank.

In August 2004, IFIC Bank sued Beximco Holdings Ltd, a subsidiary of BEXIMCO, at the Dhaka Bankruptcy Court to recover 1.37 billion BDT from the company. Also accused in the case were A S F Rahman, Salman F Rahman, Iqbal Ahmed, and M A Qasem.

In August 2007, Bangladesh Bank found irregularities with the purchase of IFIC Bank shares by Mosaddak Ali Falu, former member of parliament of the Bangladesh Nationalist Party. He had violated Foreign Exchange Regulation Act and Money Laundering Prevention Act by purchasing shares under a Malaysia registered company, Bel Construction SDN BHD. The Malaysian company was owned by Falu, Enayetur Rahman, and Ekramul Haque. Falu and his partners owned 13.7 per cent of the shares and the government of Bangladesh owned 34.54 per cent shares. Of the remaining shares, AB Bank owned 18.31 per cent, Aga Yusuf family owned 3.56 per cent, and Islam Group owned 2.21 per cent.

Justice Zubayer Rahman Chowdhury of Bangladesh High Court issued a sixth week stay order on the annual general meeting of the bank in July 2009. The order followed a petition by Monirul Alam, a shareholder of the bank, requesting a stay and challenging his disqualification from standing for election to the board of directors of the bank.

In November 2013, IFIC Bank announced plans to become a sharia complaint islamic bank.

In May 2014, two officials of IFIC Bank to five year jail sentence for stealing from the bank 2.5 million taka in Chittagong along with three others.

Bangladesh Bank ordered the removal of Mohammad Lutfar Rahman Badal from the board of directors of IFIC Bank in October 2015. He is the secretary of Bangladesh Nationalist Party vice-chairman Tareque Rahman and was accused of being involved in opposition violence in Joydevpur in Gazipur District in August 2015. He was also co-owner of RTV and NTV along with Mosaddek Ali Falu. He had served as chairman of the board of directors from 2007 to 2008.

Bangladesh Bank gave permission to IFIC Bank to move US$12.28 million to Nepal Bangladesh Bank in Nepal from Bangladesh in February 2017.

In June 2018, IFIC Bank moved to auction DuSai Resort to recover loans given to resort but the resort owner M Nasser Rahman, son of former Finance Minister of Bangladesh M Saifur Rahman, was able to secure a stay order from the courts.

In February 2019, Ahmed Shayan Fazlur Rahman, son of Salman F Rahman, became vice-chairman of IFIC Bank.

In June 2021, IFIC Bank announced plans to raise 10 billion BDT from perpetual bonds, nine billion BDT from private placement, and one billion BDT by public offer to meet the requirements of BASEL-III.

IFIC Bank announced plans to divest from Nepal Bangladesh Bank and sell its share, 40 per cent, in the bank to Nabil Bank in January 2022. It sold the shares for 4.39 billion BDT to Sarika Chaudhary wife of Binod Chaudhary. The bank issued five billion BDT worth of bonds in June.

Directors
 Salman F Rahman MP - Chairman 
 Ahmed Shayan Fazlur Rahman - Vice Chairman 
 Rabeya Jamali - Independent Director
 Sudhangshu Shekhar Biswas - Independent Director  
 A.R.M. Nazmus Sakib - Director 
 Quamrun Naher Ahmed - Director
 Md. Zafar Iqbal, ndc - Director 
 Shah A Sarwar, MD & CEO

See also

 Nepal Bangladesh Bank

References

BEXIMCO group
Banks of Bangladesh
Companies listed on the Dhaka Stock Exchange
Banks established in 1976
Bangladeshi companies established in 1976